Straight Up is a short lived Canadian television series produced by Back Alley Film Productions. Although critically acclaimed, the show only ran for 13 episodes on CBC Television from 1996 to 1998. Set in Toronto, the show dealt with the gritty problems of teenagers living in an urban environment.

Rather than focusing on a core group of principal characters, each episode would typically feature a different set of the ensemble teenage cast. Initially, although the character relationships were intertwined, each episode would feature a self-contained plot usually involving only a few of the characters. However during the second season, there was a continuing story arc involving a murder over multiple episodes.

Although Straight Up only lasted for two seasons, it spawned the spin-off series Drop the Beat, which followed the characters of Jeff and Dennis as DJs at a campus radio station.

Cast
Tomas Chovanec as Tony
Evelyn Anders as Claire
Mona Atwell as Simone
Morpheus Blak as Vanya
Robin Brûlé as Marcia
Marc Cohen as Murray
Nicole Crozier as Louise
Sasha Dindayal as Charlene
Chad Donella as Rick
Dyson Forbes as Dyson
Omari Forrester as Pipe
Tamara Gorski as Corey
Suzanne Hatim as Sondra
Erin Hicock as Jaz
Kirk Lewis as Clay
Noam T.C.S. Lior as Ed
Shawn Mathieson as Steve
Merwin Mondesir as Dennis
Justin Peroff as Rory
Sarah Polley as Lily
Mark Taylor as Jeff
Jacob Tierney as Alex

Episode list

Season 1

1.1 - Jam

1.2 - Dead Babies

1.3 - Big Time

1.4 - Small Bang Theory

1.5 - Sacrifice Trick 

1.6 - Seize

Season 2

2.1 - Strapped

2.2 - Raw

2.3 - Mortifying

2.4 - Façade

2.5 - Gravity (Kim Poirier guest starred as AJ's Gang Member in this episode)

2.6 - Pudding

2.7 - Bomb

Awards and nominations

At the 1997 Gemini Awards, Jerry Ciccoritti won for "Best Direction in a Dramatic or Comedy Series" for the episode "Small Bang Theory" and James Bredin was nominated for "Best Picture Editing in a Dramatic Program or Series" for same episode.

At the 1998 Gemini Awards, Sarah Polley won for "Best Performance in a Children's or Youth Program or Series" for the episode "Mortifying" and Jerry Ciccoritti won for "Best Direction in a Dramatic or Comedy Series" again this time for the episode "Raw" . Also at these awards, Merwin Mondesir was nominated for "Best Performance in a Children's or Youth Program or Series" for the episode "Façade", Karen Walton was nominated for "Best Writing in a Children's or Youth Program and Series	" for the episode "Gravity". The episode "Raw" was also nominated for "Best Sound in a Dramatic Program or Series" and "Best Costume Design". Finally, Straight Up was nominated for "Best Children's or Youth Program or Series".

References

External links
 

1990s Canadian teen drama television series
1996 Canadian television series debuts
1998 Canadian television series endings
CBC Television original programming
Television series about teenagers
Television shows filmed in Toronto
Television shows set in Toronto